DE1 is a Ukrainian two section locomotive series. 40 units were produced from 1997 to 2008 by Dnipropetrovsk research-and-production association for electric locomotive engineering.

Electric locomotives of Ukraine
Railway locomotives introduced in 1997
5 ft gauge locomotives